Lieutenant General Amardeep Singh Aujla  (born 3 December 1966) UYSM,YSM, SM, VSM is an Indian Army General serving as the current General Officer-Commanding (GOC) of the Srinagar-based Chinar Corps(XV). He took over from Lieutenant General Devendra Pratap Pandey after the latter completed his term as the Corps Commander. Prior to his appointment as the Chinar Corps Commander, the General served briefly as Director General of Information Technology at Army Headquarters, New Delhi and majorly as Major General General Staff (Operations) of Northern Command.

Early life and education 
Aujla hails from Mohali, Punjab and is an alumnus of Indian Military Academy, Dehradun. Lt Gen Aujla has attended prestigious career courses including the Defence Services Staff College, Wellington, Higher Command Course at Army War College, Mhow and National Defence College, New Delhi. He holds M Phil in Defence and Strategic Studies from Devi Ahilya University, Indore and also from Madras University, Chennai.

Career 
Aujla commissioned into 13th Battalion The Rajputana Rifles on 19 Dec 1987. The General has immense experience in Counter Insurgency Operations having served multiple times in Jammu and Kashmir. He has commanded 15th Battalion The Rajputana Rifles in deserts, an Infantry Brigade and an Infantry Division (Vajra Division) along the Line of Control in North Kashmir.

He has held numerous Instructional and Staff appointments which include two tenures as instructor at the Commando Wing, The Infantry School, Belgaum and an instructor tenure at HQ IMTRAT, Bhutan, a tenure as Brigade Major of an Infantry Brigade during OP PARAKRAM, Colonel General Staff in a Corps HQ, Director Perspective Planning in IHQ of MoD (Army), Brigadier General Staff (Operations) at Chinar Corps, Brigadier Infantry (C) at Infantry Directorate, IHQ of MoD (Army) and Major General General Staff (Operations) at HQ Northern Command.

He took over the reins of Srinagar-based XV Corps as the 51st General Officer Commanding on 10 May 2022.

Commander, 268 Infantry Brigade 
The General Officer commanded 268 Infantry Brigade from 30 Dec 2013 to 15 Jun 2015. Numerous successful operation were conducted under his stewardship leading to establishment of complete dominance and absolute control along the line of Control while giving and impetus to Defence Infrastructure development in a huge way.

General Officer Commanding, 28 Infantry Division 
The General Officer commanded 28 Infantry Division from 01 Nov 2019 to 03 Dec 2020. Numerous successful operation were conducted under his stewardship leading to establishment of complete dominance and absolute control along the line of Control while giving and impetus to Defence Infrastructure development in a huge way.

Honours and decorations                                                                                                                                                              

He has been awarded the Uttam Yudh Seva Medal (2023), Yudh Seva Medal (2021), Sena Medal (2019), Vishist Seva Medal (2016) and the COAS and GOC-in-C Commendation Card for His Service.

References

Indian generals
Living people
1966 births
Recipients of the Yudh Seva Medal
Recipients of the Sena Medal
Recipients of the Vishisht Seva Medal
Army War College, Mhow alumni
Defence Services Staff College alumni
National Defence College, India alumni
People from Mohali